Al-Washm Region (local Najdi Arabic pronunciation: , also spelled Washm, or Al-Washim, is a historical region in Najd in the central of Saudi Arabia.

Etymology
Washm means tattoo in Arabic. Researchers suggested that Al-Washm has been named due to the scattered farms which looks similar to a tattoo.

Location
Al-Washm Region is located about 190 kilometers north-west of the capital Riyadh.

Towns
The Al-Washm Region includes Shaqraa, Ushaiger, Uthaithiah, Al Qasab, Al Faraah, and Tharmada.

History

The exact history of the Al-Washm Region is unknown. However, the Umayyad poet Ziyad bin Munfidh around the year 100 AH had passed over Shaqraa and mentioned it in his poem.

Najd